Xiphydria is a genus of wood wasps belonging to the family Xiphydriidae.

Species of this genus are found in Europe, Japan and North America.

Species
The following species are recognised in the genus Xiphydria:
 
 Xiphydria albopicta Shinohara & Kameda, 2019
 Xiphydria annulitibia Takeuchi, 1936
 Xiphydria betulae (Enslin, 1911)
 Xiphydria camelus (Linnaeus, 1758)
 Xiphydria duniana Gourlay, 1927
 Xiphydria irrorata F.Pesarini, 1995
 Xiphydria kanba Shinohara, Hara & Smith, 2020
 Xiphydria kastsheevi Ermolenko, 1979
 Xiphydria konishii Shinohara, Hara & Smith, 2020
 Xiphydria laeviceps Smith, 1860
 Xiphydria longicollis (Geoffroy, 1785)
 Xiphydria megapolitana (Brauns, 1884)
 Xiphydria melanoptera Shinohara, Hara & Smith, 2020
 Xiphydria mellipes Harris 1841
 Xiphydria nagasei Shinohara, 2019
 Xiphydria ogasawarai Matsumura, 1927
 Xiphydria palaeanarctica Shinohara, 2019
 Xiphydria picta Konow, 1897
 Xiphydria prolongata (Geoffroy, 1785)
 Xiphydria scutellata Konow, 1897
 BOLD:AAG7648 (Xiphydria sp.)
 BOLD:ACW8274 (Xiphydria sp.)
 BOLD:ADX5042 (Xiphydria sp.)
 BOLD:AED1517 (Xiphydria sp.)

References

Xiphydriidae
Hymenoptera genera